is a passenger railway station located in the city of Fujisawa, Kanagawa, Japan and operated by the private railway operator Odakyu Electric Railway.

Lines
It lies 52.0 kilometers from the Shinjuku terminus.

Station layout
The station consists of two opposed side platforms serving two tracks, which are connected to the station building by a footbridge. The tunnels visible from the platform towards Fujisawa Station are the only tunnels on the Enoshima Line.

Platforms

History
Zengyō Station was opened on October 1, 1960 with the development of a large housing district with the same name nearby.

Passenger statistics
In fiscal 2019, the station was used by an average of 27,011 passengers daily.

The passenger figures for previous years are as shown below.

Surrounding area
Kanagawa Prefectural Sports Center

See also
 List of railway stations in Japan

References

External links

  

Railway stations in Kanagawa Prefecture
Railway stations in Japan opened in 1960
Odakyū Enoshima Line
Railway stations in Fujisawa, Kanagawa